The Morris–Jumel Mansion or Morris House (also known as the Roger and Mary Philipse Morris House, "Mount Morris" and Morris–Jumel Mansion Museum) is an 18th-century Federal style museum home in upper Manhattan, New York City. It was built in 1765 by Roger Morris, a British military officer, and served as a headquarters for both sides in the American Revolution.

Located at 65 Jumel Terrace, in Roger Morris Park in the Washington Heights neighborhood of Manhattan, New York City, it is the oldest house in the borough. The home and grounds were purchased as a museum home in 1903 and declared a National Historic Landmark in 1961. The exterior was designated a New York City Landmark in 1967, with the interior following in 1975. The area around the Morris-Jumel Mansion, the Jumel Terrace Historic District, was also designated as a New York City historic district in 1970.

Site

The mansion is located atop a ridge, Coogan's Bluff, from which lower Manhattan, the Hudson River including the Palisades, the Bronx, Westchester, the Long Island Sound, and the Harlem River were once visible. It is located in Roger Morris Park, a public park within the boundaries of the Jumel Terrace Historic District, but is landmarked separately from the historic district.

The mansion overlooked Coogan's Hollow and the Polo Grounds, a baseball and football stadium built in 1890 and razed in 1964. The mansion is sometimes visible in old pictures of the ballfield that show Coogan's Bluff. Today the Polo Grounds Towers stand where the stadium once was.

History

Morris ownership
Roger Morris, a British military officer who was serving as a member of the Executive Council of the Province of New York, built the house in 1765 for himself and his American-born wife, Mary Philipse Morris. They lived in it for ten years, from 1765 until 1775, when the American Revolution began. Roger Morris held the position of captain in the British army during the French war, while his wife, Mary Phillipse, was daughter to speaker of the assembly Frederick Philipse II. She was often described as " beautiful, fascinating, and accomplished."

As British loyalists, Morris went to England at the start of the war, while his wife and family went to stay at the Philipse estate in Yonkers. Morris returned in 1777, after the city had been captured by the British. He became the Inspector of the Claims of Refugees until 1783, when he and his family left for England after the British defeat in the Revolution.

Between September 14 and October 20, 1776, General George Washington used the mansion as his temporary headquarters after his army was forced to evacuate Brooklyn Heights following their loss to the British Army under the command of General William Howe in the Battle of Long Island. During his stay there from September 14 to October 20, 1776, Washington made note of his experience there. It is claimed without foundation by those with a romantic inclination that Washington not only selected the house because of its location but also because Mary Philipse had been a love interest for him twenty years before.

The house is one of the major remaining landmarks of Battle of Harlem Heights, after which it became the headquarters of British Lieutenant General Sir Henry Clinton, and the Hessian commander Baron Wilhelm von Knyphausen.

Confiscation
Because the Morrises were Loyalists, the house and their jointly held one-third share of the massive  Philipse Patent immediately north of today's Westchester County border were confiscated in 1779 by the Revolutionary government of the Colony of New York's Commissioners of Forfeiture. They were sold off during the dark times of the Revolution for the Colonials to fund its Continental Army led by Washington. Despite assurance of restitution in the 1783 Treaty of Paris no compensation to the Morrises was ever forthcoming from either the state of New York or American government.

Following its confiscation, Mt. Morris served as a farmhouse and a tavern, "Calumet Hall", a popular stop along the Albany Post Road.

Jumel purchase

The mansion was bought in 1810 by Stephen Jumel, a rich French merchant who had immigrated to the United States, as a home for himself and his wife, and former mistress, Eliza Bowen Jumel, along with their adopted daughter Mary Bowen, who was thought to be the daughter of Eliza's stepsister. Throughout her adult life, Eliza Jumel lived richly and luxuriously. Eliza, who had come from poor beginnings, was known for being a woman who sought out a higher social position for herself as well as a life that encompassed having large amounts of wealth.

Thus, she was always seen around men of power and fortune. Anxious to be accepted into New York society, the Jumels remodeled the house, adding the Federal style entrance, and redecorated the interior in the Empire style. Because they were not accepted socially in New York, the Jumels went to France in 1815, although Eliza returned from 1817 to 1821. She returned for good in 1826 with Stephen Jumel's power of attorney, and he returned in 1828.

Eliza was subject to many accusations in both France and New York, one of them being her involvement in the unpleasant death of her first husband. After Stephen's death in 1832 from injuries he received in a carriage accident, Eliza, who was now one of the wealthiest women in New York City, married the controversial ex-vice president Aaron Burr in the front parlor of the house.

She filed for divorce in 1834, which was granted in 1836, shortly before his death. Eliza then divided her time among Saratoga, New York; Hoboken, New Jersey; and lower Manhattan. Her step-daughter's family lived with her in the mansion until 1862. Eliza Jumel – who became very eccentric, if not insane, in her later years – died in 1865. The care and love she had for the mansion helped it evolve into the representation of art and culture it has been for over two and one-half centuries within the New York City area.

As a museum

The government of New York City purchased the house itself in 1903 from the owners at the time, the Earles, with the help of the Daughters of the American Revolution. It was converted into a museum run by the Washington Headquarters Association, formed by four chapters of the Daughters of the American Revolution. The Colonial Dames of America and the Daughters of the American Revolution announced conflicting plans to operate the house, and the New York City Department of Parks and Recreation took over operation.  The museum opened in 1904, and was renovated and refurnished in 1945. The house is owned by the Department of Parks and Recreation, and is a member of the Historic House Trust.

The Morris–Jumel Mansion's exterior underwent an extensive renovation starting in 1990. In 2002, the house was repainted and the windows were replaced. The Historic House Trust announced in November 2021 that the house would be renovated again at a cost of $2.7 million.

During its history, the Morris–Jumel Mansion hosted many other distinguished visitors, including dinner guests John Adams, Thomas Jefferson, Alexander Hamilton, and John Quincy Adams.

Architecture

The house was built as a summer villa on a parcel comprising an area of 130 acres. Thus, the Morris property covered some distance from Harlem all the way to the Hudson River. It is an early example of the Palladian style of architecture. Morris, whose uncle was a successful architect in England, was influenced by Palladio, a 16th-century Italian architect. His design included a double-height portico and triangular pediment – innovative features for 1765 – supported by grand Tuscan columns, and a two-story octagonal room at the rear of the mansion, which is believed to be the first of its kind in the country.

The remodeling by the Jumels c.1810 was in the Federal style current at the time, and included the entrance.

The house has been said to contain "some of the finest Georgian interiors in America." Today, the house is lavishly decorated with period furnishings and careful reproductions of period carpets and wallpaper. It features nine restored rooms, one of which was Washington's office. The dining room and Eliza Jumel's bedchamber, with a bed that supposedly belonged to Napoleon, are also open. Personal artifacts of Roger Morris, George Washington, Eliza Jumel, and Aaron Burr are part of the museum's collection. An archive and reference library is located in the house's third floor.

In literature and media

 On a rocky eminence overlooking one of the rivers, Fitz-Greene Halleck wrote his famous lines on the Greek patriot Marco Bozzaris.
 At the beginning of his historical novel Burr (1973), author Gore Vidal recreates the wedding of Eliza Bowen-Jumel and Aaron Burr, with a detailed description of the interior of the house circa 1833, which is still evident today.
 In 1996, the Morris–Jumel Mansion was featured in Bob Vila's A&E Network production Bob Vila's Guide to Historic Homes of America.
 Lin-Manuel Miranda wrote portions of his 2015 musical Hamilton at the Morris–Jumel Mansion.
 In 2014, the television show Ghost Adventures filmed an episode at the mansion to investigate reports of paranormal activity
 In 2015, Saturday Night Live filmed a skit called “Ghost Chasers” at the mansion.
 In 2019, the television show Broad City filmed a scene at the mansion to celebrate Abbi Jacobson’s 30th birthday.
 In 2021, the television show Surviving Death featured the mansion in episode 5.
 Edward W. Hardy presented his 2021  Omnipresent Music Festival - BIPOC Musicians Festival at the Morris–Jumel Mansion.
In 2021, the house featured on Buzzfeed Unsolved: Supernatural

See also 
 List of Washington's Headquarters during the Revolutionary War
 List of New York City Designated Landmarks in Manhattan above 110th Street
 List of National Historic Landmarks in New York City
 National Register of Historic Places listings in Manhattan above 110th Street
 Whitehall (Annapolis, Maryland)

References 
Explanatory notes

Citations

External links 

 
 
 American Memory at the Smithsonian 
 
 

Federal architecture in New York (state)
Historic house museums in New York City
Houses completed in 1765
Houses in Manhattan
Houses on the National Register of Historic Places in Manhattan
Military headquarters in the United States
Museums in Manhattan
National Historic Landmarks in Manhattan
New York City Designated Landmarks in Manhattan
New York City interior landmarks
Washington Heights, Manhattan